Sandia Cave, also called the Sandia Man Cave, is an archaeological site near Bernalillo, New Mexico, within Cibola National Forest.  First discovered and excavated in the 1930s, the site exhibits evidence of human use from 9,000 to 11,000 years ago.  It was declared a National Historic Landmark in 1961.  The site is open to the public, up a difficult half-mile trail off New Mexico State Road 165.

Description
The Sandia Cave is located on a steep side wall of Las Huertas Canyon, on the north side of the Sandia Mountains northeast of Albuquerque, New Mexico.  The public trailhead to access the cave is on the east side of NM165. The site is rather difficult to reach, as it is requires traversing ledges and a steep metal staircase.

History
The cave was discovered in 1936.  Archaeologists argued about claims associated with this site for decades, making it difficult to determine its importance. The site was excavated in the 1930s and 1940s by Frank Hibben while at the University of New Mexico.

Both Folsom and Sandia hunting points were recovered, with the hitherto unknown Sandia points interpreted by Hibben as being much older than any other evidence of man in North America. Faunal remains included extinct, Pleistocene mammals. Later study of stratigraphy and radiometric dates corrected serious earlier misinterpretations, leaving "Sandia Man" as definitely younger than earlier claimed.

Faunal remains recovered by Hibben and others include such extinct forms as mammoth, mastodon, sloth, horses, and camels, as well as many mammal and bird species that survived the end of the Pleistocene, making this one of the most important Pleistocene paleontological sites in northern New Mexico.

See also

List of National Historic Landmarks in New Mexico
National Register of Historic Places listings in Sandoval County, New Mexico

References

External links 
USFS description of Sandia Man Cave
Video of two spelunkers exploring Sandia Man Cave
Description of Sandi Cave at showcaves.com

National Historic Landmarks in New Mexico
Landforms of Sandoval County, New Mexico
Archaeological sites in New Mexico
Archaeological sites on the National Register of Historic Places in New Mexico
Caves of New Mexico
Show caves in the United States
Limestone caves
National Register of Historic Places in Sandoval County, New Mexico
Cibola National Forest